Mirabilistrombus is a monospecific  genus of sea snails, marine gastropod mollusks in the family Strombidae, the true conchs.

Species
Species within the genus Mirabilistrombus include:
Mirabilistrombus listeri (T. Gray, 1852)

References

Strombidae